Nanzhou Station, formerly Nanzhou Coach Station during its planning stages, is an interchange station between Line 2 on the Guangzhou Metro and the Guangfo Line.

The underground station is located under the junction of Nanzhou Road and Dongxiao Road South, near the Nanzhou Coach Station in Haizhu District, Guangzhou. The station for Line 2 started operation on 25 September 2010 and the station for Guangfo Line started operation on 28 December 2018.

Station layout

Exits
There are 3 exits leading in and out of the station, with 1 exit having 2 sub-exits.

References

Railway stations in China opened in 2010
Guangzhou Metro stations in Haizhu District
Foshan Metro stations#